The 2005 Austrian Figure Skating Championships took place between 18 and 19 December 2004 in Innsbruck. Skaters competed in the discipline of men's singles, ladies' singles. The results were used to choose the Austrian teams to the 2005 World Championships and the 2005 European Championships.

Senior results

Men

Ladies

External links
 results

Austrian Figure Skating Championships
Austrian Figure Skating Championships, 2005
2006 in figure skating
Figure skating
Figure skating